Wilhelm Loeper (born 30 March 1998) is a Swedish footballer who plays for Helsingborgs IF.

References

1998 births
Living people
Swedish footballers
Association football forwards
Djurgårdens IF Fotboll players
Arameisk-Syrianska IF players
AFC Eskilstuna players
Helsingborgs IF players
Allsvenskan players
Superettan players
Ettan Fotboll players